Michal Tamir (Hebrew: מיכל טמיר) (born in Israel on January 31, 1970) is president of the Israeli Law and Society Association. She is a professor of public law and criminal procedure law in The Academic Center of Law and Science in Israel, and a practicing lawyer.

Biography
Michal Tamir was born on January 31, 1970, in Tirat Carmel, Israel, to parents of Iraqi origin. She is a professor of law at The Academic Center of Law and Science. She also serves as an adjunct professor at the Bar Ilan University's Faculty of Law. Tamir earned her LL.B. in the University of Haifa (1995 cum laude and ranked first) and LL.M. in the Hebrew University (1999 "magna cum laude", and ranked first). She received her LL.D. in 2005 from the Hebrew University. Her doctoral thesis was on "Selective Enforcement", supervised by former Supreme Court Justice, Professor Yitzhak Zamir. Professor Tamir served from 1995 to 1996 as an intern of Supreme Court Justice Yitzhak Zamir and in 1997 she served as a legal assistant for Supreme Court Justice Dorit Beinisch. During the academic year 2005–2006 she made her post-doc as part of a part of The Hauser Global Law School Program, NYU.
Professor Tamir is a member of The Israel Bar Association since 1996.

Research areas
Constitutional law; Administrative Law; Criminal Procedure Law; Tender Law; Human Rights in Private Law; The Right to Equality and Non-Discrimination; Selective Enforcement

Publications
Professor Tamir wrote the book Selective Enforcement (Nevo Publishers, 2008), which provided the basis for the new judicial review ground on prosecution and administrative authorities. The book is cited frequently in the Israeli Supreme Court decisions. Her second book, The State Comptroller: a Critical  Look (The Israel Democracy Institute Publication, 2009), evoked a debate on the intervention of the State Comptroller in public policies issues and non-systematic issues. Her article Equality of Homosexuals and Lesbians (2000) was one of the first theoretical attempts to deal with the issue in Israel and was widely quoted. The article was used in a precedent decision of the Family Court (2004), which approved a family agreement between homosexual couple and the mother of one of the spouse's children. The article was also used in the Israeli Supreme Court decision (2010), which ordered the Jerusalem Municipality to support the activity of the Jerusalem Open House for Pride and Tolerance (JOH). Many other Tamir's articles are quoted in the Supreme Court decisions.

References

External links
 Professor Michal Tamir's page in the Academic Center of Law and Science, Israel is here.
 Professor Michal Tamir's SSRN page here.

1970 births
Living people
Hebrew University of Jerusalem Faculty of Law alumni
Israeli women lawyers
University of Haifa alumni